Samta Colony is an residential area situated in the heart of Raipur, Chhattisgarh. It is surrounded by the main posh area, Choubey Colony.

It covers about 10% of the area of the city. It is situated about 2 km from the main market of the city. It covers about 2 km2 area of Raipur. There are many places of attraction such as temples, gardens, etc.  Four large hospitals serve the area.

Demographics 
Samta colony is a mixed community of Marwari, Gujrati, Sikh, Rajput, Marathi, Muslim and Sindhi people.

Transport 
Samta Colony is 2 km from Raipur main railway station, 4.5 km from Raipur new bus stand & 18 km from  Swami Vivekananda Airport.

Temples 
 Hanuman Mandir:- a very old & highly respected temple, serving the Marwari community of the city.
 Shyam Mandir:-  a huge temple built by the Shyam Mitra Mandal Community, who worship Shri Shyam Baba (an avatar of Lord Krishna). Many religious functions are held there every month.
 Radha Krishna Mandir:- a very beautiful temple with very beautiful statue of Shri Krishna & Radha Ji made from imported marbles. Beautiful glass work is done inside the temple, seen in very few temples of the city.

Amenities 
A large market flows through the main road of the Colony which includes the shop for all the basic necessities such as provision store, Jawed Habib's hair salon, medical stores, etc.

You can get amazing restaurants over here.

Infrastructure 
It is a high society, complete with all the essential requirements that a society should have such as proper water & electricity supply, effective drainage, healthcare services and in the clear streets for the vicinity. Samta colony has one of the highest residential property prices in Raipur due to its location and amenities.

Hospitals 
 Life Worth Super Specialty Hospital
 Pandey Nursing Home
 Kedar Hospital
 Sachdeo Nursing Home
 Chhattisgarh Hospital
 Goyal Nursing Home
 DR.Abhimanyu's Pain Relief Center

Education 
 Raj Kumar College:- A 160-year-old school, a large campus of more than 100 acres.
 Pragati College:- A college deals with education of commerce.
 Dolphin School :- A CBSE affiliated 10+2 school with more than 10 campuses within the society.Closed 

Raipur, Chhattisgarh
Neighbourhoods in Chhattisgarh